Las Acacias is a barrio (neighbourhood or district) of Montevideo, Uruguay.

Landmarks
This neighborhood is the home of Peñarol's  stadium, Estadio Contador Damiani (formerly Las Acacias Stadium).  Peñarol Football Club is one of the two major soccer teams in Uruguay.

Places of worship
 Parish Church of the Sacred Hearts, José A. Possolo 4025 (Roman Catholic)

References

See also 
Barrios of Montevideo

Barrios of Montevideo